Borys Davidovich Deich (28 August 1938 – 7 February 2022) was a Ukrainian politician.

Biography
A member of the Party of Regions, he served as a member of the Verkhovna Rada from 2002 until 2014. He supported the annexation of Crimea by Russia.

Deich died from COVID-19 in Moscow on 7 February 2022, at the age of 83.

References

External links
Boris Deich

1938 births
2022 deaths
Deaths from the COVID-19 pandemic in Russia
20th-century Ukrainian politicians
21st-century Ukrainian politicians
Fourth convocation members of the Verkhovna Rada
Fifth convocation members of the Verkhovna Rada
Sixth convocation members of the Verkhovna Rada
Seventh convocation members of the Verkhovna Rada
Party of Regions politicians
Donetsk National University of Economics and Trade alumni
Recipients of the Order of State
Recipients of the Order of Prince Yaroslav the Wise, 4th class
Recipients of the Order of Prince Yaroslav the Wise, 5th class
Recipients of the Order of Merit (Ukraine), 3rd class
Holocaust survivors
People from Sighetu Marmației
Romanian people of Ukrainian descent